The 1995 Arkansas Razorbacks football team represented the University of Arkansas during the 1995 NCAA Division I-A football season.

The 1995 season was a season of firsts for Arkansas. It saw the Razorbacks beat Alabama, Memphis St, Auburn, and Mississippi St for the first time in school history, as well as winning a game played in the Liberty Bowl in Memphis, Tennessee (vs Ole Miss). 1995 was also the first time that Arkansas won the SEC West Division championship. 
Sophomore running back Madre Hill broke the Arkansas single season rushing yards record (1,387), and the single game rushing touchdown record (6 vs South Carolina). Hill was named 1st team All-SEC, along with senior defensive end Steven Conley, who tied the Arkansas single season sacks record (14). Senior QB Barry Lunney Jr. ended his career as Arkansas' career leader in pass attempts, pass completions, and passing yards. All of his records have since been broken by various Arkansas quarterbacks. Lunney also started 40 career games for the Hogs.

Schedule

Roster

References

Arkansas
Arkansas Razorbacks football seasons
Arkansas Razorbacks football